Nazarabad (also Romanized as Naz̧arābād) is a village in Chaleh Tarkhan Rural District, Qaleh Now District, Ray County, Tehran Province, Iran. At the 2006 census, its population was 16, in 4 families.

References 

Populated places in Ray County, Iran